A lounge lizard is an idle person or musician who spends inordinate time in nightclubs and cocktail lounges.

Lounge lizard may also refer to:

 Austin Lounge Lizards, a band from Austin, Texas formed in 1980
 The Lounge Lizards, a jazz group formed in 1978 by saxophone player John Lurie
 Lounge Lizards (album), a 1981 album by The Lounge Lizards
 Lounge Lizards (EP), a 2011 EP by Purling Hiss
 Leisure Suit Larry in the Land of the Lounge Lizards, the first in a series of video games starring Leisure Suit Larry.